John Cutler may refer to:

Politicians
John Cutler alias Carwithan (d. ?1467), MP
John Cutler (MP for Huntingdon) for Huntingdon (UK Parliament constituency)
 John Christopher Cutler (1846–1928), second governor of the U.S. state of Utah

Sports
 Jon Cutler (born 1981), professional wrestler
 John Cutler (sailor) (born 1962), yachtsman from New Zealand

Others
 Sir John Cutler, 1st Baronet, FRS (1607–1693), English alderman and MP for Taunton and Bodmin
 John Charles Cutler (1915–2003), American researcher involved in syphilis experiments
 Jon Cutler (born 1969), American house DJ
John Garrison Cutler (1833–1913) Black entrepreneur and hotelier in New Hampshire

See also
 Jon Cutler (disambiguation)
 Cutler (surname)